Julius Vähätalo (born 23 March 1995) is a Finnish professional ice hockey forward, who is currently playing for MHk 32 Liptovský Mikuláš of the Slovak Extraliga. 

Vähätalo was drafted 166th overall by Detroit Red Wings in the 2014 NHL Entry Draft.

Playing career
During the 2013–14 season, Vähätalo was an assistant captain for HC TPS's Jr. team, where he recorded 18 goals and 21 assists in 33 games, as well as three goals in 18 games for HC TPS.

After spending the first four seasons of his professional career with TPS, Vähätalo left the club in signing a contract with fellow Liiga club, Mikkelin Jukurit, on 18 April 2017.

International play
Vähätalo represented Finland at the 2015 World Junior Ice Hockey Championships, where he did not record any points in five games.

Career statistics

Regular season and playoffs

International

References

External links

1995 births
Living people
People from Rusko
Detroit Red Wings draft picks
Finnish ice hockey forwards
Mikkelin Jukurit players
HC TPS players
TuTo players
Sportspeople from Southwest Finland
MHk 32 Liptovský Mikuláš players
IF Troja/Ljungby players
Finnish expatriate ice hockey players in Sweden
Finnish expatriate ice hockey players in Slovakia